Bignonia capreolata is a vine commonly referred to as crossvine.  The common name refers to the cross-shaped pattern revealed when the stem is cut; this pattern results from four radial wedges of phloem embedded within the stem's xylem.  It is native to the central and southern United States.  The vine climbs without twining but does produce tendrils.  It produces long tubular flowers which are red and yellow and frequently have a mocha fragrance.  The leaves are dark green to almost purple and produced as opposite pairs with terminal tendrils.  The vine often climbs very high, with leaves only remaining on the uppermost portion of the plant. Crossvine can spread aggressively through stolons and may need to be managed in garden or domestic settings.

There was for some time confusion surrounding the name of this plant, which was apparently sometimes referred to as "Bignonia crucigera", a name more properly referring to a different plant altogether.

Medicinal use

One 18th century report describes a medicinal use for cross-vine by the Cherokee people:

"The vines or climbing stems of the climber (Bigonia Crucigera)  are equally divided longitudinally into four parts by the same number of their membranes somewhat resembling a piece of white tape by which means, when the vine is cut through and divided traversely, it presents to view the likeness of a cross. This membrane is of a sweet, pleasant taste. The country people of Carolina crop these vines to pieces, together with china brier and sassafras roots, and boil them in their beer in the spring, for diet drink, in order to attenuate and purify the blood and juices. It is a principal ingredient in Howard's famous infusion for curing the yaws, etc., the virtues and use of which he obtained from Indian Doctors."

In 2012, researchers at Bastyr University published a paper revealing that they had identified the indole alkaloid reserpine in Crossvine.

References

External links
Bioimages from Vanderbilt University
Trees, Shrubs, and Woody Vines of North Carolina: Crossvine (Bignonia capreolata)
USDA Natural Resources Conservation Service. Crossvine (Bignonia capreolata)

capreolata
Plants used in traditional Native American medicine
Plants described in 1753
Taxa named by Carl Linnaeus
Flora of the Southeastern United States
Flora of the Northeastern United States
Flora of the North-Central United States
Flora of the South-Central United States
Flora without expected TNC conservation status